The 1984 UCF Knights football season was the sixth season for the team. It was Lou Saban's second and final season as the head coach of the Knights. After a disappointing 1–6 start to the season, Saban stepped away from the program, and was replaced by assistant coach Jerry "Red" Anderson. The Knights finished the year with a 2–9 overall record, facing a schedule entirely made up of Division I-AA opponents. The program had actually petitioned the NCAA to move the football program up to I-AA for 1984, but the move was delayed, in part due to costs and incurred debt. The move would not happen until 1990.

The Knights competed as an NCAA Division II Independent. The team played their home games at the Citrus Bowl in downtown Orlando.

In their October 20 game against Illinois State, the Knights fell behind 21–0 in the first quarter. UCF rallied for a 28–24 victory, their largest comeback win in school history. As of 2021, it is still tied for the program's best comeback win.

Schedule

References

UCF
UCF Knights football seasons
UCF Knights football